During the 1997–98 English football season, Swindon Town F.C. competed in the Football League First Division.

Season summary
Swindon started the season brilliantly and at the end of October they were top of the table but it all started to go downhill after hammering Oxford 4–1 in December, when Swindon managed just three more wins from the remaining 26 league games which also included an embarrassing FA Cup home defeat to non-league Stevenage. They finished the season in a lowly 18th position, and the pressure on McMahon to resign was immense, but chairman Rikki Hunt refused to sack him.

Final league table

Results
Swindon Town's score comes first

Legend

Football League First Division

FA Cup

League Cup

Squad

References

Swindon Town F.C. seasons
Swindon Town